Leopold of Habsburg may refer to:

Leopold I, Duke of Austria (1290-1326)
Leopold III, Duke of Austria
Leopold IV, Duke of Austria (1371-1411)
Archduke Leopold Wilhelm of Austria (1614-1662)
Leopold I, Holy Roman Emperor (1640-1705)
Leopold V, Archduke of Austria (1586-1632)
Leopold II, Holy Roman Emperor (1747-1792)